If the River Was Whiskey is the sixth studio album by American rock band Spin Doctors. The album was released on April 30, 2013, by Ruf Records.

The track "About a Train" first appeared on the band's 1996 album You've Got to Believe in Something.

Track listing

Personnel 
 Chris Barron - vocals
 Eric Schenkman - guitar
 Mark White - bass
 Aaron Comess - drums

Charts

References

Spin Doctors albums
2013 albums
Blues rock albums by American artists